"Start!" is the eleventh UK single release by the band The Jam and their second number-one, following "Going Underground"/"Dreams of Children". Upon its release on 15 August 1980, it debuted at number three, and two weeks later reached number one for one week. Written by Paul Weller and produced by Vic Coppersmith-Heaven and The Jam, "Start!" was the lead single from the band's fifth album Sound Affects. The single's B-side is "Liza Radley".

"Start!" is based on both the main guitar riff and bass riff of the Beatles' 1966 song "Taxman" from the album Revolver, written by George Harrison. "To be Someone" and "Liza Radley" also utilise the "Taxman" bassline as does "Dreams of Children", B-side to "Going Underground", played then as a lead guitar riff.

The album version of the song runs at 2:30 and features trumpets in the final section.

Other versions and sampling
Beastie Boys covered the song on their 1999 single, "Alive".

808 State sampled the song on their 1993 single, "10 X 10".

Manfred Mann's Earth Band covered the song on their 1987 album, "Masque" under the name "What You Give Is What You Get (Start)".

Bibliography
Martin Roach (ed) (2008) The Virgin Book of British Hit Singles, Virgin Books, London.

References

External links
 Album review at BBC Online

1980 singles
The Jam songs
UK Singles Chart number-one singles
Irish Singles Chart number-one singles
Songs written by Paul Weller
Song recordings produced by Vic Coppersmith-Heaven
1980 songs
Polydor Records singles